A United States diplomatic representative to Romania has existed since 1880. The United States formally recognized Romania in 1878, following the Treaty of Berlin; diplomatic relations were opened in 1880, and American diplomats were sent to the country. Until the early 20th century, most ambassadors to Romania were also responsible for Greece, Serbia, and occasionally Bulgaria. No US Embassy was established in Romania for some time; ambassadors typically operated out of Athens until about 1905, at which point an embassy was established in Bucharest.

The main US embassy in Romania remains in Bucharest and is located at 4-6 Dr. Liviu Librescu Blvd. For several years during World War II, following the death of Ambassador Franklin Mott Gunther, there was no American ambassador to Romania. The latter country became an Axis country, and declared war on the Allies (see Romania during World War II). Preceded by American representation in the Allied Commission after 1945, the diplomatic mission was reopened in 1947. In 1994, the US embassy was expanded, and a branch office was opened in Cluj-Napoca.

Ambassadors

Notes

See also
Romanian Embassy, Washington, D.C.
Romania–United States relations
Foreign relations of Romania
Ambassadors of the United States

References
United States Department of State: Background notes on Romania
Flaviu Vasile, Rus, ed., The cultural and diplomatic relations between Romania and the United States of America. 1880-1920, Cluj-Napoca, Mega Publishing, 2018.

External links
 United States Department of State: Chiefs of Mission for Romania
 United States Department of State: Romania
 United States Embassy in Bucharest

 
Romania
United States